Rudolf Bezděk (born February 12, 1916, date of death unknown) was a boxer who competed for Czechoslovakia in the 1936 Summer Olympics. In 1936 he was eliminated in the first round of the flyweight class after losing his fight to the upcoming bronze medalist Louis Laurie.

External links
Rudolf Bezděk's profile at Sports Reference.com

1916 births
Year of death missing
Boxers at the 1936 Summer Olympics
Czech male boxers
Czechoslovak male boxers
Flyweight boxers
Olympic boxers of Czechoslovakia